Balkhash Airport ( / )  is an airport  northeast of Balkhash, Kazakhstan.

Overview
Balkhash Airport is classified as a national aerodrome in the latest AIP. It is capable of accepting Ilyushin Il-76, Tupolev Tu-134, Tupolev Tu-154, Antonov An-8, Antonov An-12, Antonov An-24, Ilyushin Il-14, Ilyushin Il-18, Yakovlev Yak-40, Yakovlev Yak-42, and Antonov An-2 aircraft. It can also accept light aircraft and helicopters of all types.

A dirt runway was also used in the past, but it is now closed.

Military aircraft are also based there. In the last few years, civil aircraft rarely use this airport and the airport is mainly used by the sky diving club of the city of Balkhash and the military.

Airlines and destinations

References 

Airports in Kazakhstan